An LED strip light (also known as an LED tape or ribbon light) is a flexible circuit board populated by surface mounted light-emitting diodes (SMD LEDs) and other components that usually comes with an adhesive backing. Traditionally, strip lights had been used solely in accent lighting, backlighting, task lighting, and decorative lighting applications. Increased luminous efficacy and higher-power SMDs have allowed LED strip lights to be used in applications such as high brightness task lighting, fluorescent and halogen lighting fixture replacements, indirect lighting applications, ultraviolet (UV) inspection during manufacturing processes, set and costume design, and even growing plants.

Beginning in 2021, LED lighting in the form of "Flex neon" is starting to replace neon sign lighting.

Design 
Variables in strip lighting consist of water resistance, color, adhesives, choice of SMD, driving voltage, control type, and whether it is constant current or constant voltage layout.

Uncoated LED tape is not considered to have any resistance to water ingress, but may be rated as IP20 for some physical ingress resistance. Such tapes are generally low voltage and safe for skin to touch but can be shorted by fine metal objects. Water resistant strip lighting is covered in a heat conducting epoxy or silicone to protect the circuitry from direct contact with water, and can be rated IP65, IP67, or with suitable sealed connections IP68. Both coated and uncoated LED tapes have a two sided adhesive backing to stick to walls, desks, doors, etc.

The most common design differences are in how individual LEDs are controlled, specifically differences in color and whether or not each LED is addressable.
Single color, non-addressable: Every LED on the strand is a single white colour, typically ranging from 2200K to 6500K in color temperature, or any of several monochrome colors covering the range of the visible spectrum (generally from 400-700 nanometers in wavelength).
Dynamic tunable white (often described with CCT), non-addressable: Allows the user to adjust the color temperature output from a single strip light. They are manufactured with alternating LEDs of different color temperatures, so half of the LEDs are a lower temperature and half are a higher color temperature, allowing the strip to produce any specific color temperature between the two color temperatures of the LEDs.
Multicolor, non-addressable: Each LED is capable of displaying red, green, blue, or all three (white), driven by three input power rails. All the LEDs display the same colour at any one time, but the colour can  be manipulated by varying the voltage applied to each of the three power inputs.
RGB, addressable: Multiple colours and addresses. Each LED has its own chip meaning they can be individually triggered for chasing, strobing, and colour changing.
RGBW, non-addressable: The combination of single color and multicolor (4 LED-chips) in a single module
RGBCCT or RGBWW: The combination of dynamic tunable white and multicolor (5 LED-chips) in a single module

LED strip designs are available populated with many different types of SMD, not only in different colors and addressable or non-addressable, by different shapes, sizes, and power levels. The most common types of SMD are: 3528, single colour, non-addressable, very low power; 5050, containing three LEDs allowing for RGB and addressable strips as well as higher power levels; 2835, a newer single-color SMD having the same surface dimensions as the 3528 but a larger emitter area and a thinner design with an integrated heatsink allowing for higher power levels; 5630/5730, a newer replacement for single-color 5050 SMDs which can operate at slightly higher power levels and have high efficacy. Less common designs may have 3014, 4014, 7020, 8020, or other SMDs. In addition to the LED SMD type, the quantity of LEDs per meter is also an important factor in determining the overall power and brightness.

LED strip lights most commonly operate on 12 or 24 volts of direct current from a power supply, sometimes referred to as a driver. USB strip lights operate on the standard 5-volt direct current used by USB devices.  Mains voltage LED strips are also available.  These have the advantages of being usable in much longer single runs without a brightness drop along the length, but are less flexible and heavier due to higher voltage and current ratings and thick coatings for shock safety and high IP ratings in their intended outdoor positions, with limited cut points. No separate power supply is needed, although there must be a rectifier between the mains supply and the end of the LED strip.
The most common PCB designs use multiple parallel circuits consisting of passive dropper resistors in series with a certain number of LED SMDs, to operate at a certain current and power level with the expected input voltage. This design is referred to as constant-voltage and is rather sensitive to small variations in input voltage and to the voltage drop that occurs along long lengths of strip when driven from a single power input. Alternative design is the "constant current" design where each parallel circuit of several SMDs includes a small integrated circuit to provide a fixed current to that group of LEDs, within a wide range of applied voltages. This allows the strip to operate at the same power level and brightness along its entire length, or with some variation in the driver voltage.

Any customizations require an LED controller to adjust brightness, color, or individual LED activity. This can be done with an included controller or customized with a microcontroller.

'Neon' or 'flex' LED tape refers to LED tape constructed in such a way to emulate neon lights. The LED tape is embedded on the side of a silicone filled, plastic C-channel; the silicone both diffuses the light from the LED tape and directs it out to one side, 90 degrees to the direction the SMD LEDs face. This design allows the lights to be bent in what appears to be the opposite direction to how regular LED tape can be bent, allowing one to spell words and create pictures with it much like neon signs.

Beam angle 
Some LEDs are rated as having a 120° beam angle, directed "up", i.e. perpendicular to the mounting surface. 'Side view' or 'edge emitter' SMDs are designed such that light is emitted parallel to the adhering surface (i.e., 90 degree difference to typical tape design). These allow the construction of LED strips which wash surfaces within less space or accent edge profiles such as signage.

Dimming 
LEDs can be dimmed efficiently using pulse-width modulation (PWM).  This strategy rapidly switches the LEDs on and off, typically 500 times per second, by changing the voltage from zero to the designed value in an "on-off" fashion.  The LED sees its drive as a square wave. The relative width of the on and off portions of the square wave can be varied so that the LEDs are on or off for relatively more or less time to change brightness. Addressable LEDs do this dimming internally given a data signal which specifies which  colour LEDs to turn on, while non-addressable LEDs require an external PWM controller.

Applications 

Strip lights are designed for both indoor and outdoor use depending on whether they are water resistant. Since the strip is flexible and can be divided at any point between LEDs, it is extremely versatile and can be used in a number of installations. Outside of traditional lighting, strip lighting is extensively used in DIY projects or lighted clothing. The ability to power strip lights off of a USB device or battery pack makes them extremely portable. Examples include computer lighting, costume lights, toys, workspace lighting, monitor and display ambient lighting, and alcove lighting.

Popularity 
During the early 2020s, LED strip lights gained popularity among users on the social media platform TikTok.

References 

Light-emitting diodes
LED lamps